Oakridge (also Oak Ridge) is an unincorporated community in Mount Vernon Township, Winona County, Minnesota, United States.

Notes

Unincorporated communities in Winona County, Minnesota
Unincorporated communities in Minnesota